Bujak may refer to:

 Bujak (surname)
 Buják, a village and municipality in Hungary
 Bujak, Masovian Voivodeship, a village in Poland

See also
 Bucak (disambiguation)
 Bucaq, Yevlakh (disambiguation)
 Budjak (disambiguation)